Penn Foster may refer to the distance education schools:

Penn Foster Career School
Penn Foster College
Penn Foster High School